Saint George Hospital University Medical Center (Arabic: مستشفى القديس جاورجيوس للروم الأرثوذكس or مستشفى القديس جاورجيوس الجامعي), also known as Al-Roum Hospital (مستشفى الروم), is the oldest Lebanese Christian founded teaching hospital in 1878, It is affiliated with Saint George University of Beirut and one of the three leading Lebanese medical centres, located in Rmeil, Beirut, Lebanon.

Overview
The hospital configuration is a T-shaped fifteen-floor building currently housing 200 beds. It is affiliated with The Centre Hospitalier Universitaire de Toulouse and the Centre Hospitalier Universitaire de Poitiers.

In 2005, a new state-of-the-art building was inaugurated. The rehabilitation and reconstruction of the 1968 building is underway (Phase II)- this new extension will house an additional 200 beds by the end of 2015, thus bringing the total number of beds to 400.

History
Saint George Hospital was founded in 1878 as a non-profit community hospital by Panoyot Fakhoury. A member of the Orthodox community, he donated two rooms in his Gemayze home to be used as a clinic and in-patient facility.

A new 90-bed hospital was built in 1913, followed by another 275-bed facility in 1966.  The current facility is a 200-bed hospital built in June 2004. By 2020, the hospital had 330 beds.

Doctors and nurses were treating patients in a nearby parking lot. Within hours, it discharged all its patients, some to other hospitals, and closed. The building was severely damaged   The hospital's Director of Intensive Care, Dr. Joseph Haddad, was quoted as saying, "There is no St. George Hospital any more. It's fallen, it's on the floor ... It's all destroyed. All of it." The damage to the hospital was a severe blow to Beirut's healthcare facilities; a COVID-19 pandemic and over 6,000 injuries, as a direct result of the explosions, put great pressure on healthcare facilities.

Although the hospital was forced to temporarily close after the explosion, enough restoration work was completed by the end of August to allow one floor to become operational again.  Chief Medical Officer Alexandre Nehme estimated that it would take more than US$40 million and about a year to bring the whole hospital back up to operational status.

References

External links 
 

Medical education in Lebanon
Teaching hospitals
Hospital buildings completed in 1913
Hospital buildings completed in 1966
Hospital buildings completed in 2005
Buildings and structures in Beirut
Eastern Orthodoxy in Lebanon
1878 establishments in the Ottoman Empire
Hospitals established in 1878
2020 Beirut explosion
Hospitals in Lebanon